Konrad Becker (born January 9, 1959 in Vienna) is an artist, hypermedia researcher, and interdisciplinary content developer, director of the Institute for New Culture Technologies-t0 and initiator of Public Netbase and World-Information.Org.

Music and acting
As actor, Konrad Becker is known for his role as Böckstiegel in Wolfgang Petersen's anti-war drama Das Boot (1981).

As a musician Konrad Becker created Monoton, the crucial Austrian electronic music act providing distinguished soundscapes. The Wire magazine singled out Monoton’s record Monotonprodukt07 as one of the 100 most important records of the 20th century. In recent years, Konrad Becker has focused on notebook live jamming with minimalist rigor.

At the borderline of sound art, psychoacoustics and contemporary dance practices, Konrad Becker's project has crossed a variety of genres over the years and has gone through various mutations and side projects. Starting with meta-mathematical and performative multimedia installations, from industrial ambience noise to audio software art and a dance context in the early rave scene he also developed theatrical productions.

"Like other Germanic groups (Kraftwerk, Neu, Cluster, Conrad Schnitzler), Monoton's products have turned out to be fine forerunners of certain trends in electronic music at the end of the twentieth century." (Eric Mattson, ORAL, 2002)

Art, writing, multimedia 

Since 1979, he has been active in electronic media as an artist, writer, composer, curator, producer and organizer of numerous intermedia productions, exhibitions, and event designs for international festivals and cultural institutions. He has published media works, electronic audiovisuals and theoretical texts, lectured and held positions at various universities, and participated in conferences and symposia. He has been a member of various boards and committees on information and communication technologies and culture, and has worked as a consultant.

Institute for New Culture Technologies-t0 

A focal point of Konrad Becker’s activities as a new media researcher, activist and theoretician is the Institute for New Culture Technologies-t0, which he founded together with Francisco de Sousa Webber. Starting its activities in 1993, t0 created one of the first arts and culture related sites on the emerging World Wide Web. It is one of the pioneering organizations in this field in Europe and has also assumed a very important role on the local level as a main site for the development of the new media arts and cultural scene in Vienna/Austria. t0’s activities are implemented mainly through long-term projects / sub-organizations, e.g. Public Netbase and World-Information.Org, currently: World-Information Institute.

In addition to the strategic development of the Institute and its projects, Becker’s activities include the conceptualization of conferences and exhibitions, lecturing, research projects; his theoretical approach is also developed in a series of books which started in 2002 with Tactical Reality Dictionary.

Publications 
 Psychonautic, MonotonProdukt, Wien (1986)
 Die Politik der Infosphäre- World-Information.Org, VS-Verlag für Sozialwissenschaft, BPB Berlin (2002) [in German]
 Tactical Reality Dictionary, Cultural Intelligence and Social Control, Selene Verlag Wien, Autonomedia New York (2002)
 Tactical Reality Dictionary, Russian translation and Foreword by Oleg Kireev, Ultraculture Publishing, Moscow (2004)
 Konrad Becker, Martin Wassermair (Hg.), Kampfzonen in Kunst und Medien. Eine Veröffentlichung des World-Information Institute, Wien: Löcker 2008,  [in German]
 Konrad Becker, Felix Stalder (eds.): Deep Search. The Politics of Search beyond Google, Studienverlag Innsbruck (2009)
 Strategic Reality Dictionary. Deep Infopolitics and Cultural Intelligence, Autonomedia New York (2009)
 Konrad Becker, Martin Wassermair (Hg.), Phantom Kulturstadt. Eine Veröffentlichung des World-Information Institute, Wien: Löcker 2009,  [in German]
 Konrad Becker, Jim Fleming (eds.): Critical Strategies in Art and Media. Perspectives on New Cultural Practices, Autonomedia New York (2010)
 Konrad Becker, Martin Wassermair (Hg.), Nach dem Ende der Politik. Eine Veröffentlichung des World-Information Institute, Wien: Löcker 2011,  [in German]
 Dictionary of Operations – Deep Politics and Cultural Intelligence (with an introduction by Hakim Bey and an afterword by Franco Berardi Bifo), Autonomedia NY (2012), 
 Konrad Becker, Felix Stalder (Hg.), Fiktion und Wirkungsmacht. Eine Veröffentlichung des World-Information Institute, Wien: Löcker 2016,

Filmography

References

External links 
 Short biography of Konrad Becker
 Monoton's Entry at Discogs
 Konrad Becker´s Entry in Austrian Music Database Skug Research Archive
 World-Information Institute, Institute for New Culture Technologies/t0
 Public Netbase
 Konrad Becker at the Surveillance & Control Symposium (Tate, London)
 

Living people
Austrian electronic musicians
20th-century Austrian male artists
21st-century Austrian male artists
Minimal wave musicians
1959 births